, subtitled looking up at the half-moon and also known as Hantsuki, is a Japanese romance light novel series written by Tsumugu Hashimoto and illustrated by Keiji Yamamoto centering on two hospitalized seventeen year olds and the love they begin to share. The series was originally serialized in MediaWorks' now-defunct light novel magazine Dengeki hp and spanned eight volumes released between October 2003 and August 2006.

An anime series was adapted from the novels and aired in Japan on the WOWOW television network between January 12 and February 23, 2006 with six episodes. A manga series by B.Tarō was serialized in MediaWorks' shōnen manga magazine Dengeki Comic Gao! between August 2005 and November 2006; two volumes were released. A set of five drama CDs were produced between October 2006 and August 2007 by Wayuta. A live-action drama of the series was aired on TV Tokyo between October and December 2006, and a live-action film premiered in Japanese theaters in April 2010.

Plot
The story of Hantsuki focuses on the budding relationship between the seventeen year old Yūichi Ezaki and Rika Akiba. They are hospitalized in Yūichi's home town for their conditions. Yūichi has hepatitis A, while Rika has problems with a weak heart valve. These teens then fall in love while they spend time with one another. The story is based in Ise, Mie prefecture.

Characters

Hospital patients

; played by: Atsushi Hashimoto (TV Series), Sosuke Ikematsu (Film)
A seventeen-year-old high school student who is hospitalized for hepatitis A. He notices a beautiful girl, Rika, in the east wing of the hospital and is later encouraged by the nurse Akiko to befriend her. Within minutes Yūichi enrages Rika by lying about having read her favorite book, but Rika offers to forgive Yūichi if he were to obey her wishes. Eager to gain that forgiveness, he agrees. As they spend time together, Yūichi begins to fall in love with Rika.

; played by: Miku Ishida (TV Series), Shiori Kutsuna (Film)
Rika is a seventeen-year-old girl who has been hospitalized for most of her life due to a weak heart valve that also affected her father and ultimately killed him. Due to this prolonged hospitalization, she is without friends and spends her time reading books by her favorite author, Ryūnosuke Akutagawa. She has a close relationship with Dr. Natsume, which is a source of tension in her relationship with Yūichi.

A perverted old man who has an enormous pornography collection that he amassed during his stay in the hospital. He advises Yūichi to go after Rika if he loves her, because he will later regret it if he does not. Tada then says that he was stupid and lived a life of painful regret because he did not go after the person that he loved. Upon his sudden death, he offers his last will to Akiko, which is to pass his porno collection on to Yūichi.

Hospital staff

; played by: Yoshino Kimika (TV series), Mari Hamada (film)
The nurse who tends to Yūichi. She acts much like an elder sister to Yuichi and will not hesitate to hit him or make fun of him when he deserves it, and even beats him up when he is being seduced by her friend Misako. She is highly manipulative and nosey when it comes to Yuichi but has her tender moments and truly cares about her patients. She particularly cares about the relationship between Yūichi and Rika because she understands that Rika might not have much time to live.

; played by: Kohki Okada (TV series), Yo Oizumi (film)
The doctor who is in charge of Rika's care. He used to take care of her at another hospital but was transferred to Ise. Rika then transferred to the same hospital so that he could still be her physician. He harbors some feelings for Rika and tries to sabotage Rika and Yūichi's relationship. He went to the hospital drunk one day and he assaults Yuichi who said he was jealous. Natsume is doing this because his wife died from a condition similar to that of Rika, and does not want Yūichi to experience the same thing.

Yūichi's friends

; played by: Takuya Nakayama (TV series), Ryosuke Kawamura (film)
He comes to visit him occasionally and helps him with secret missions that will help Yūichi's relationship with Rika. During these missions, he wears a Zebra Mask to hide his identity and give him a sense of strength.

; played by: Shingo Nakagawa
He visits Yūichi when he finds out about his inheritance of the porno collection. This ultimately gets Yūichi in trouble with Rika.

; played by: Takayo Kashiwagi (TV Series), Yurie Midori (Film)
She loans a school uniform to Rika and takes her around the school. She asks Rika about her condition numerous times.

Media

Light novels
The series began as a light novel series written by Tsumugu Takahashi with illustrations by Keiji Yamamoto that was first serialized in the Japanese light novel magazine Dengeki hp. There were eight volumes released between October 10, 2003, and August 10, 2006. The novels were published by MediaWorks under their Dengeki Bunko light novel label.

Manga
A manga illustrated by B. Tarō based on the novel was serialized in the Japanese manga magazine Dengeki Comic Gao! between August 27, 2005 and November 27, 2006, published by MediaWorks. Two bound volumes were later released, the first on February 27, 2006, and the second on December 16, 2006. The volumes are published by MediaWorks under their Dengeki Comics label.

Anime
A short anime adaptation aired in Japan between January 12 and February 23, 2006; there were six episodes. The anime was produced by the Japanese animation studio Group TAC and was aired on the WOWOW television network. Three DVDs were originally released, each containing two episodes, between April 19 and June 21, 2006. The premium DVD box set containing the six episodes was released on January 16, 2008. The anime has been licensed by Japanese-based company Bost Digital Entertainment for distribution through their video streaming website Bost TV. The episodes are available only to Australia and New Zealand for the price of US$1.99 per episode. Crimson Star Media licensed the anime for a North American release in September 2013, however, the release was canceled following the prison sentence of Corey Maddox, who was in charge of the company. The series was later re-licensed by Lucky Penny, a division of Right Stuf Inc.

Episodes

Music and audio CDs
The anime's opening theme was "Aoi Kōfuku" and the ending theme was "Kioku no Kakera"; both songs were sung by Nobuko and written and composed by Macado. The maxi single containing the opening and ending themes was released on February 15, 2006. The Hanbun no Tsuki ga Noboru Sora Original Soundtrack for the anime version was released on March 15, 2006. A set of five drama CDs based on the series were released between October 4, 2006 and August 24, 2007, produced by Wayuta.

TV drama
A live-action television drama adaptation ran on TV Tokyo from October 3 to December 26, 2006, containing thirteen episodes. A DVD boxset was later released on February 23, 2007. Hanbun no Tsuki ga Noboru Sora was the first novel series under Dengeki Bunko to receive a TV drama adaptation.

Film
A live-action film was released on April 3, 2010. Directed by Yoshihiro Fukagawa, the film starred Sosuke Ikematsu and Shiori Kutsuna. It was shot on location in places in Mie Prefecture. The theme song is "15 no Kotoba" by singer-songwriter Mao Abe.

References

External links
Official website 
MediaWorks' official Hanbun no Tsuki ga Noboru Sora website 
Live action drama official website 
Hanbun no Tsuki ga Noboru Sora at Tokyo MX  
Hanbun no Tsuki ga Noboru Sora at Bost TV

2003 Japanese novels
2006 Japanese television series debuts
2006 Japanese television series endings
Anime and manga based on light novels
Dengeki Bunko
Dengeki Comic Gao!
Dengeki Comics
Kadokawa Dwango franchises
Group TAC
Japanese drama television series
Light novels
2005 manga
Romance anime and manga
Shōnen manga
Television shows based on light novels
Japanese romance films